Professor Emil Hamilton is a fictional comic book character appearing in books published by DC Comics, usually as a supporting character in stories featuring Superman.

The character was portrayed by Richard Schiff in Man of Steel.

Publication history
Created by writer Marv Wolfman and artist Jerry Ordway, Professor Emil Hamilton first appeared in The Adventures of Superman #424 (January 1987). His depictions in various incarnations range from that of a trusted ally to Superman and his colleagues to one who is cautious and mistrustful of Superman and his power, to an unambiguous villain. The character was named after Edmond Hamilton, who wrote stories about Superman and other characters from the 1940s to the 1960s.

Fictional character biography
Emil Hamilton first appeared in The Adventures of Superman #424 (January 1987), as an apparent villain, using his gadgets to attack Superman in an attempt to gain funding by proving that they worked. A former employee of S.T.A.R. Labs and the US Government, it transpired he had been driven insane when all his research was bought up by Lex Luthor, who took credit for the inventions. He was placed in a mental health facility and responded well to treatment. On his release, he set up a laboratory in Suicide Slum and quickly became Superman's "scientific advisor", eking out a general living as a technical consultant. He was responsible for creating many devices that aided Superman, including the Phantom Zone Projector and early Superman Robots, as well as helping Superman during such problems as the 'Krisis of the Krimson Kryptonite', when red kryptonite created by Mister Mxyzptlk shut down Superman's powers; until Superman's powers were restored, Hamilton provided him with various machinery such as a force field belt and an armored suit to allow him to continue as a hero. Later, another force field belt Emil provides allows Superman to get around the power-blocking talents of the artificial life forms 'Psi-Phon' and 'Dreadnaught'.

Emil's first time turning evil is when the immortal 'Mister Z' brainwashes him into assisting in an attack on Superman.

Later, Superman is fighting the alien monster Doomsday. Working with Bibbo, another ally of the Man of Steel, Emil sets up a powerful laser and scores a direct strike on the monster. It does little to stop it. The two combatants seemingly fall dead and Emil creates a CPR unit for the hero. Bibbo is injured while using it and Hamilton takes over. Their efforts fail and Superman is declared dead. This failure causes feelings of intense guilt that not even Hamilton's long-term female friend Mildred Krantz can help him overcome. After the hero's return, Emil helps in the investigation of a Superman 'corpse duplicate'. He lost an arm during the "Fall of Metropolis" storyline, but replaced it with a self-designed cybernetic prosthesis.

He also provided Superboy with the visor that duplicated Superman's vision powers (x-ray and heat vision). This helps Superboy get a start on a heroic career in Hawaii. Hamilton would also enjoy time in that state as well. He spends time with Superman, assisting him in restoring in Fortress of Solitude and saving the lives of the citizens of the Bottle City of Kandor.

Villainy
Many years later, when John Henry Irons returned to Metropolis, just prior to the B13 Event, Hamilton felt he was being sidelined, as Superman now had access to a scientific genius who was also a fellow superhero. He disappeared during the B13 Event when Metropolis was transformed into a future version of itself.

He eventually resurfaced as the Overmind, the leader of a cyberpunk gang plotting the return of Brainiac 13. He claimed, however, that the B13-technology in his prosthetic arm was controlling his actions. Presumably this claim held some truth, as he later returned to his role as Superman's advisor using his innate understanding of the futuristic technology now available to him.

Hamilton, together with several other scientific geniuses and robotic beings (Automan, Brainstorm, Doctor Cyber, Ford, and Rosie the Riveter), was for a brief period part of the composite cybernetic being called Enginehead. However (if this story is still canon), the being seems to have been divided into the individual personalities again shortly after the events of the series.

In a 2005 storyline it was revealed that Hamilton was, in fact, the villain named Ruin, who had been targeting Superman's loved ones. Ruin claimed to have discovered that Superman was sucking the sun dry of its solar energy, and that, in 4.5 billion years, it would mean the end of life on Earth. The identity of Ruin had been kept a mystery, until it seemed that Clark's friend, and former President of the United States, Pete Ross was Ruin. Pete Ross claimed innocence, but he became even more suspect when he escaped from custody. It turned out that it had been Hamilton who had framed Ross and kidnapped him again from prison. Hamilton then confronted and revealed himself to Superman, seemingly killing the 5th dimension imp Mister Mxyzptlk in the process when he tried to save Superman. Superman defeated the insane Hamilton and saved Pete, Lana Lang, and their child. Superman later cleared Ross' name and reputation, and Hamilton was apparently imprisoned.

During the events chronicled in the "Infinite Crisis" storyline, Ruin was one of many superhuman criminals who joined the villainous Society organized by Alexander Luthor Jr.

The pre-"Flashpoint" version of Emil Hamilton appears during the 2015 "Convergence" storyline. He has seemingly reformed, having made a home in the pre-"Flashpoint" Gotham City on the planet Telos, and repaired his friendship with Jimmy Olsen. Emil spent time rebuilding the Whiz Wagon, a flying, multi-purpose vehicle, as self-imposed reformation therapy.

Powers and abilities
Emil Hamilton is a normal human being and thus, has no inherent super powers, though he is a brilliant scientist and inventor, having designed and built devices such as a force-field generator. However, as Ruin he dons a "power suit." The suit allows Ruin to take advantage of his knowledge of Superman's weaknesses. Powerful blasts of Kryptonian red sunlight can be fired from the suit, which essentially sap Superman of all his powers. Also, Ruin is able to transport himself to the Phantom Zone (though at a detriment to his health), and reemerge anywhere, effectively allowing him to teleport. If the suit is forcibly removed from Hamilton's body, it self-destructs with a massive force, apparently enough to destroy a small city, although enough time elapsed between the removal and the explosion for Superman to get it to a safe distance using his superspeed.

Emil has designed various prosthetic arms with unusual abilities, including one that acted as a sunscreen dispenser.

Other versions
 Professor Hamilton made an appearance in the Elseworlds tale, JLA: The Nail. In this story, Hamilton still operates S.T.A.R. labs, but it is a secret-alien research facility in Smallville, Kansas that includes various heroes and villains who have been publicly identified as aliens to increase paranoia among the population (it is unclear if Hamilton is a willing part of the propaganda program or genuinely believes the idea that metahumans are alien invaders). Hamilton also appeared in Elseworld's Finest: Supergirl and Batgirl, featuring Batgirl and Supergirl, having previously worked with Lex Luthor to create a new solar battery only to be disgraced when he tried to reveal the truth about the project (it actually uses the corpse of the infant Kal-El as a power source).

 Hamilton continues to play a supporting role in the Smallville Season Eleven comic. With his new position at STAR Labs, he was tasked with helping the Watchtower Network with the construction of an outpost on the Moon. Months later, Emil was unexpectedly reunited with Tess, who was revealed to still be alive, inside the brain of her half-brother, Alexander/Conner Kent. Tess was extracted from Lex's brain and Emil uploaded her consciousness to the Watchtower computer system. Because of an earlier incident with Hank Henshaw and his robotic body, who had been in the same situation as Tess, Emil began acting as her psychiatrist. After Tess downloaded herself into an android body called "Red Tornado", the two began going on dates. As her activities with the new Justice League required her to spend time on the new Lunar outpost, Emil decided to get himself certified in space travel, thus allowing him to visit her there.

In other media

Television
 Dr. Emil Hamilton appears in Lois and Clark: The New Adventures of Superman, portrayed by John Pleshette. In the episode "That Old Gang of Mine", Hamilton had used the DNA of Al Capone to regenerate the criminal as part of an experiment that would reprogram him as a good citizen, though this also led to Al Capone making Hamilton recreate John Dillinger and Bonnie and Clyde as part of a plot to take over Metropolis. The clones are defeated by Superman and arrested by the police as Hamilton goes quietly with Detective Wolfe and he is not in trouble and just want to know how he resurrected them. In the episode "Return of the Prankster", Hamilton explains to Lois Lane and Clark Kent how Prankster's light ray causes paralysis, and makes special contact lenses for Superman to use to defeat Prankster.
 Professor Hamilton appears in two shows in the DC Animated Universe:
 Professor Hamilton was a regular in Superman: The Animated Series, voiced by Victor Brandt. He starts out and serves as a valuable ally to Superman for a majority of the series, constructing things for his use such as Kryptonite-resistant suits from lead and other utilities like inter-dimensional warps, as well as working on a Phantom Zone projector in the episode "Blasts from the Past". After Superman is brainwashed by Darkseid and attacks Earth in the series finale "Legacy", Hamilton begins to distrust him and other metahumans. 
 Later in Justice League Unlimited, Professor Hamilton (now voiced by Robert Foxworth) had secretly joined Project Cadmus. Hamilton is Cadmus' expert geneticist who used cloning and other methods to create the government-aligned team known as the Ultimen. He is also revealed to have obtained some of Supergirl's DNA during the events of "Legacy", and created a clone of her named Galatea. Superman finally discovers Hamilton's betrayal of trust in "Question Authority". Hamilton is unrepentant of his actions, and makes it clear that he believes Superman can never be fully trusted again, comparing him to Lucifer. In one surprising moment, Galatea hugs Hamilton referring to him as "Daddy", making Hamilton to realize his regret of turning his “daughter” into solely a super-weapon. He and Amanda Waller eventually discover that Lex Luthor manipulated both Cadmus and the Justice League to achieve his own selfish gain. After Luthor and Brainiac are defeated, Hamilton’s current whereabouts are unknown.
 There were two Doctor Hamiltons in the live-action TV series Smallville:
 Steven Hamilton was introduced in the first season, portrayed by Joe Morton. An expert in mineralogy and meteors, Dr. Hamilton was hired by Lex Luthor to examine the effects of kryptonite and psychosis given his status as the "meteor freak" of town. Through his partnership with Lex, he'd later to produce a cure for the effects of the deadly Nicodemus flower during his work for Cadmus Labs. In the second season, he dies from overexposure to kryptonite, before driven insane from it. The series has given no indication of any relationship between Steven and Emil Hamilton other than a shared surname. 

 In the season eight episode "Identity", Emil Hamilton's name was seen in a Daily Planet article about the mysterious "Red-Blue Blur", Clark Kent's earliest superhero identity, which had been sighted around the city of Metropolis. His first on-screen appearance is in the episode "Bulletproof", where he is played by Alessandro Juliani, who went on to appear in a total of 14 episodes. He appears as a private doctor hired by Oliver Queen for his team who saves the Martian Manhunter's life following being shot by a corrupt police officer.

 In "Beast", after Clark loses the use of his powers to Parasite, Hamilton equips Clark with a fast, high-tech car. In season ten, he regularly assists the Justice League, he is subject to interrogation by proponents of the Vigilante Registration Act, attends Clark's bachelor party, and has a one-night stand with Tess Mercer. He took over Virgil Swann's role and who is Superman's lead scientist and doctor and runs STAR Labs that was founded by Virgil Swann.
 In the TV series Supergirl, Sarah Robson portrays DEO Doctor Amelia Hamilton, a female version of the character. In "For the Girl Who Has Everything", Dr. Hamilton would treat Supergirl after exposure to the Black Mercy by Non and diagnose Silver Banshee/Siobhan Smythe's powers in "Worlds Finest".

Film
 Emil Hamilton appears in Man of Steel, portrayed by Richard Schiff. This version is a DARPA scientific adviser for the U.S. military under Gen. Swanwick, who is hired to view the Kryptonian scout ship found in the Arctic. He later attends the interrogation of Lois Lane and Superman, and in the film's climax sacrifices himself to help destroy the Kryptonian engine that threatened to destroy all human life.
 An alternate universe version of Emil Hamilton appears in Justice League: Gods and Monsters, voiced by Trevor Devall. He is part of LexCorp's "Project Fair Play", a weapons contingency program that would destroy the Justice League if necessary. Professor Hamilton is seen discussing the project with the other scientists involved (consisting of John Henry Irons, Thomas Morrow, Michael Holt, Pat Dugan, Karen Beecher, Thaddeus Sivana, Kimiyo Hoshi, Stephen Shin, and Will Magnus) before they are attacked and killed by the Metal Men.

Video games
 In the 1999 video game Superman, Professor Hamilton appears as a supporting character alongside Jimmy Olsen and Lois Lane, but they are captured by Lex Luthor in the beginning of the game.
 In the beginning of the 2006 game Superman Returns, Professor Hamilton gives instructions on the meteor shower to Superman.

References

External links
 Emil Hamilton at the DC Animated wiki
 Emil Hamilton at the DC Database

Characters created by Jerry Ordway
Characters created by Marv Wolfman
Comics characters introduced in 1987
Cyborg supervillains
DC Comics characters who can teleport
DC Comics cyborgs
DC Comics male supervillains
DC Comics scientists
Fictional amputees
Fictional inventors
Fictional physicians
Superman characters